The 2006 UAW-DaimlerChrysler 400 was the third race in the 2006 NASCAR Nextel Cup Series season which took place at Las Vegas Motor Speedway on March 12, 2006.

Qualifying

Race recap

Greg Biffle clocked the fastest lap in qualifying at 172.403 mph.

In the third consecutive race to require a green-white-checker finish, Jimmie Johnson blew past Matt Kenseth on the last corner of the day to get his 20th career victory and second of the season.  Kenseth looked like a good bet to cruise to victory before Denny Hamlin and Kenny Wallace wrecked three laps from the end, bunching the field and leading to the overtime finish.  Before the lap 268 restart, Kenseth told his crew that his engine felt weak, but he was able to protect the lead until the last corner, where Johnson, who had not led all day, overtook the 17 car on the high side to take the win by a half a car length.

Race results

Failed to qualify: Stanton Barrett (#95), Hermie Sadler (#00), Brandon Ash (#02), Mike Skinner (#37), Morgan Shepherd (#89), Randy LaJoie (#92)

References

External links

 Official results

UAW-DaimlerChrysler 400
NASCAR races at Las Vegas Motor Speedway
2006 in sports in Nevada
March 2006 sports events in the United States